The 2005 FIA European Touring Car Cup was the first running of the FIA European Touring Car Cup. It was held on 16 October 2005 at the ACI Vallelunga Circuit near Rome in Italy.

Teams and drivers

Final standings

References

External links
Official website of the FIA European Touring Car Cup

European Touring Car Cup
European Touring Car Cup
European Touring Car Cup
2005 in European sport
2005 in Italian motorsport